5 Card Stud is a 1968 American Western mystery film directed by Henry Hathaway and starring Dean Martin and Robert Mitchum. The script is based on a novel by Ray Gaulden and was written by Marguerite Roberts, who also wrote the screenplay of True Grit for Hathaway the following year.

Plot
In 1880, a gambler in the small town of Rincon, 100 miles from Denver, Colorado, is caught cheating at a five-card stud poker game. The players, led by the volatile Nick Evers, take the cheating gambler to lynch him. One of the players, Van Morgan, tries to prevent the others from administering frontier justice, but is unable to stop the killing. Morgan leaves town, but later returns when he hears that several of the other players from the poker game have become victims of grisly murders.

The town has a new resident, a stern and somewhat edgy Colt .45-carrying Baptist preacher named Reverend Rudd. As more members of the lynch mob are killed off one by one, it becomes clear that someone is taking revenge, and it is up to Morgan to solve the mystery. When Morgan is the last man from the poker game left alive, he realizes that Rudd is the murderer, and he kills Rudd in a shootout.

Cast
 Dean Martin as Van Morgan
 Robert Mitchum as Reverend Jonathan Rudd
 Inger Stevens as Lily Langford
 Roddy McDowall as Nick Evers
 Katherine Justice as Nora Evers
 John Anderson as U.S. Marshal Al Dana
 Ruth Springford as Mama Malone
 Yaphet Kotto as George "Little George"
 Denver Pyle as Sig Evers
 Bill Fletcher as Joe Hurley
 Whit Bissell as Dr. Cooper
 Ted de Corsia as Eldon Bates
 Don Collier as Rowan
 Roy Jenson as Mace Jones
 Bob Hoy as Deputy Marshal

Production
The song led by Rudd at his first service in Rincon is "Mercy's Call," a late-19th-century Baptist hymn written by W. H. Doane.

This film marked one of the final appearances of Inger Stevens, and the second time that Mitchum played an unorthodox preacher (following 1955's The Night of the Hunter). 5 Card Stud brought together director Henry Hathaway and Dean Martin for a second time; the first was the 1965 film The Sons of Katie Elder starring John Wayne.

Reception 
In a contemporary review for The New York Times, critic Vincent Canby identified 5 Card Stud as one of a recent spate of "Buddy System" Westerns such as El Dorado (1966) with John Wayne and Mitchum; The Way West (1967) with Kirk Douglas, Mitchum and Richard Widmark; The War Wagon (1967) with John Wayne and Kirk Douglas; Bandolero! (1968) with James Stewart and Dean Martin; and Villa Rides (1968) with Yul Brynner, Mitchum and Charles Bronson. Canby wrote: "Without important exception. all of these titles. stories and settings are interchangeable, to say nothing of the stars, some of whom are beginning to look as if they'd been hatched from dinosaur eggs. ... Buddy System Westerns are somehow basically soft."

See also
List of American films of 1968

References

External links
 
 
 5 Card Stud at Turner Classic Movies

DVD reviews
DVD Savant review by Glenn Erickson
DVD Verdict review by Eric Profancik
digitallyOBSESSED! review by Mark Zimmer

1968 films
1968 Western (genre) films
American Western (genre) films
1960s English-language films
Films scored by Maurice Jarre
Films directed by Henry Hathaway
Films produced by Hal B. Wallis
Films set in Colorado
Films set in 1880
Paramount Pictures films
Films about poker
1960s American films